The Coral Springs Open Invitational was a golf tournament on the PGA Tour that was played at the Coral Springs Country Club (now formally known as the Country Club of Coral Springs) in Coral Springs, Florida.

It was played year only, 1970. Bill Garrett, who had never finished better than seventh in his previous five years on tour, won by one shot over Bob Murphy.

Winner

References

External links
 Country Club of Coral Springs website

Former PGA Tour events
Golf in Florida
Coral Springs, Florida
1970 establishments in Florida
1970 disestablishments in Florida